The National highways in India are a network of trunk roads owned by the Ministry of Road Transport and Highways. National highways have flyover access or some controlled-access, where entrance and exit is through the side of the flyover, at each intersection of highways flyovers are provided to bypass the city/town/village traffic and these highways are designed for speed of 100 km/hr. Some national highways have interchanges in between, but do not have total controlled-access throughout the highways. It is constructed and managed by the Central Public Works Department (CPWD), the National Highways and Infrastructure Development Corporation Limited (NHIDCL), and the public works departments (PWD) of state governments. Currently, the longest National Highway in India is National Highway 44  at 4,112 km (2,555 mi).

The National Highways Authority of India (NHAI) and the National Highways and Infrastructure Development Corporation Limited (NHIDCL) are the nodal agencies responsible for building, upgrading, and maintaining most of the National Highways network. It operates under the Ministry of Road Transport and Highways. The National Highways Development Project (NHDP) is a major effort to expand and upgrade the network of highways. NHAI often uses a public–private partnership model for highway maintenance, and toll-collection. NHIDCL uses Engineering Procurement and Construction (EPC) model to build, develop and maintain strategic roads in International borders of the country.

In India, National Highways are at-grade roads, whereas Expressways are controlled-access highways where entrance and exit is controlled by the use ramps that are incorporated into the design of the expressway. National Highways follows standards set by Indian Roads Congress and Bureau of Indian Standards.

{
  "type": "ExternalData",
  "service": "geoline",
  "properties": {
    "stroke": "#ff0000",
    "stroke-width": 1
  },
  "query": "# NHs in India\nSELECT ?id ?idLabel\n(concat('', ?idLabel, '') as ?title)\nWHERE\n{\n?id wdt:P31 wd:Q34442 . # is a highway\n?id wdt:P17 wd:Q668 . # in India\n?id wdt:P16 wd:Q1967342 . # in List of SH in Kerala\nSERVICE wikibase:label { bd:serviceParam wikibase:language 'en'}\n}"}

Characteristics 

India has  of National Highways as of March 2021.

National Highways constituted 2.7% of India's total road network, but carried about 40% of road traffic, as of 2013. In 2016, the government vowed to double the highway length from 96,000 to 200,000 km.

The majority of existing highways are now four-lane roads (two lanes in each direction), though much of this is being expanded to six or more lanes. Some sections of the network are toll roads. Only a few highways are built with concrete. Bypasses have been constructed around larger towns and cities to provide uninterrupted passage for highway traffic. Some existing roads have been reclassified as National Highways.

History 

The National Highways Act, 1956 provided for public i.e. state investment in the building and maintenance of the highways.

The National Highways Authority of India was established by the National Highways Authority of India Act, 1988. Section 16(1) of the Act states that the function of NHAI is to develop, maintain, and manage the National Highways and any other highways vested in, or entrusted to, it by the Government of India.

In 1998 India launched a massive program of highway upgrades, called the National Highways Development Project (NHDP), in which the main north–south and east–west corridors and highways connecting the four metropolitan cities (Delhi, Mumbai, Chennai and Kolkata) have been fully paved and widened into four-lane highways. Some of the busier National Highway sectors in India were also converted to four- or six-lane limited-access highways.

National Highways and Infrastructure Development Corporation Limited started functioning w.e.f. 18 July 2014. It is a fully owned company of Government of India under Ministry of Road Transport and Highways and was created to develop, maintain and manage the national highways, strategic roads and other infrastructure of India. It was dedicated to the task of promoting regional connectivity in parts of the country which share international boundaries. It is responsible  for the development, maintenance and management of National Highways in hilly terrain of North-East part of India, Andaman & Nicobar Islands, Himachal Pradesh, Jammu & Kashmir, Ladakh and Uttarakhand. It works as a specialised agency in high altitude areas and border areas. Apart from highways, NHIDCL is constructing logictic hubs and transport related infrastructure e.g. multimodal transport hubs such as bus ports, container depots, automated multilevel car parking etc.

The Ministry of Road Transport and Highways adopted a new systematic numbering of National Highways in April 2010. It is a systematic numbering scheme based on the orientation and the geographic location of the highway. The new system indicates the direction of National Highways whether they are east–west (odd numbers) or north–south (even numbers). It also indicates the geographical region where they are with even numbers increasing from east to west starting from NH2 and odd numbers increasing from north to south starting from NH1.

Bharatmala, a centrally-sponsored and funded road and highways project of the Government of India with a target of constructing  of new highways, has been started in 2018.

Network Length

year wise +National Highways in India, by state  and union territories 
As at end-March and length in Kms
Source: Ministry of Road Transport and Highways, Government of India.

State-wise Length of National Highways
Note:Yearly data for 2018 and 2020 are not available.

Trivia

 The shortest National Highway is NH766EE, which spans , from Hettikeri to Belekeri port in Karnataka.

 The Leh–Manali Highway connecting Leh in Ladakh to Manali in Himachal Pradesh is the world's second highest-altitude motorable highway.

See also
 List of National Highways in India by highway number
 List of National Highways in India by state
 List of National Highways in India by union territory
 India–Myanmar–Thailand Trilateral Highway
 Roads in India

References and notes

External links

 Story of a village by the highways

 
Roads in India